The Military Hospital formerly called Delta Clinic is an Armed Forces health facility in New GRA, Port Harcourt (local government area), Rivers State, Nigeria. The hospital was originally built by Shell-BP in the early 60's to serve as a centre of medical care for the company’s expatriate and local staff. Presently, the hospital is owned by the government of Nigeria.

See also
Military hospital
List of hospitals in Port Harcourt

References

Further reading
 Stokel-Walker, Chris. African Lions: The Colonial Geopolitics of Africa's Gas & Oil (2011), Introduction pp 12–13
 Udo, Reuben K. Geographical Regions of Nigeria (1970), Problems of the Nigerian cocoa industry 29 Impact of the oil industry on the areas of operation pp 62–63

Hospitals in Port Harcourt
Military hospitals
Landmarks in Port Harcourt
Military installations of Nigeria